Mario Pedini (1918–2003) was an Italian politician who was a member of the Christian Democrats. He served at the Italian Parliament and Italian Senate. He held different ministerial posts and was one of the early members of the European Parliament.

Biography
Pedini was born in Montichiari, Brescia, on 27 December 1918. He had a degree in philosophy from the University of Pavia in 1943. He also obtained a degree in law. Following his graduation he worked as solicitor, teacher and principal at secondary schools. Following the end of World War II he became a member of the Christian Democracy Party. From 1953 he was elected to the Italian Parliament and in 1976 he was elected as a senator.

Pedini served as the undersecretary for scientific research in 1968 and then as the undersecretary for foreign affairs between 1969 and 1974. He was the minister of scientific research in the fourth cabinet of Aldo Moro from 1975 to 1978. He also served as the minister of cultural and environmental heritage in the period 1976-1978 and as the minister of public education and universities in the period 1978–1979. He was a member of the European Parliament for two terms: from 1959 to 1968 and from 1979 to 1984. Pedini retired from politics in 1984 and worked as a lecturer in the field of economy of the European Union at the University of Parma.

In 1977 Pedini was appointed director of the University of Brescia of which he was the president between 1979 and 1985. He died on 7 July 2003.

Views
In mid-1970s when Pendini and Aldo Moro were both serving as cabinet ministers they had close economic and political relations with Latin America, Africa, Asia, the Middle East, and Russia. They also managed to have good relations with the United States during the Cold War period.

Honor and legacy
Pedini was the recipient of the Italian Medal of Merit for Culture and Art (30 October 1980). He was posthumously awarded the gold medal for Civil Valor in 2005. In 2019 a square was named after him in his hometown, Montichiari.

References

External links

1918 births
2003 deaths
Christian Democracy (Italy) politicians
Education ministers of Italy
Deputies of Legislature II of Italy
Deputies of Legislature III of Italy
Deputies of Legislature IV of Italy
Senators of Legislature VII of Italy
MEPs for Italy 1958–1979
MEPs for Italy 1979–1984
Politicians from Brescia
Senators of Legislature VIII of Italy
Deputies of Legislature V of Italy
Deputies of Legislature VI of Italy
University of Pavia alumni
Academic staff of the University of Parma
Academic staff of the University of Brescia
Culture ministers of Italy
Environment ministers of Italy